Marilyn Jaye Lewis (born July 22, 1960 in Columbus, Ohio) is an American writer and editor of novels, short stories, memoirs, screenplays and teleplays. Lewis grew up in Cleveland, Ohio in the 1960s. Lewis began writing during her preteen years. She spent her high school years in Columbus before moving to New York City in 1980.  She initially focused her creative energies mainly on singing and songwriting, before beginning to write more fiction in the 1980s. Lewis studied recording and audio engineering in New York. She worked there as a singer-songwriter under the name Marilyn Jaye, and later under her married name, Marilyn Jaye Lewis, until 1994. During those years, Lewis performed at such iconic New York clubs as SpeakEasy, Folk City and CBGB. Lewis was included twice in Fast Folk Musical Magazine, Jack Hardy's music magazine, recorded on vinyl. Those recordings are now in the Smithsonian Collection and available on Smithsonian Folkways. Lewis appeared on Volume 1, No. 6 with her song "Breaking Glass." Her song "One Thing Leads to Another" was included in Volume 1, No. 10.

By the mid-1990s her work consisted of writing fiction exclusively. A hallmark of Lewis's work has been her willingness to confront the issues of racism, prejudice and bigotry. This theme can be seen throughout her career, from the young interracial couple in Neptune and Surf, to the Puerto Rican characters in Freak Parade, the gay men and lesbians in 1920s Hollywood in Twilight of the Immortal, and right through to the incredibly talented African American artist Helen LaFrance who is so lovingly documented in Tell My Bones. Always growing as a writer, Lewis expanded her repertoire to screenplays and teleplays in 2012 with Tell My Bones. After making it to the second round of the Austin Film Festival in 2012, Tell My Bones won the Ohio Independent Screenplay Award in the Best Voice of Color category in 2013. Also in 2013, Lewis wrote a TV pilot called Cleveland's Burning which was a semi-finalist in the Industry Insider Television Writing Contest. The program is a family drama following an African American family in Cleveland as they react to the turmoil of the 1960s.

Awards

 Semifinalist, 2013 Industry Insider Television Writing Contest for Cleveland's Burning
 Best Voice of Color Screenplay, 2013 Ohio Independent Screenplay Award for Tell My Bones: The Helen LaFrance Story
 Silver Medal, 2011 Independent Publisher Book Awards for Freak Parade
 Finalist, 2000 William Faulkner Creative Writing Competition for The Curse of Our Profound Disorder
 Award winner, 2000 New Century Writer Awards for The Curse of Our Profound Disorder

Works

Screenplays
 Cleveland's Burning, 2012
 Tell My Bones: The Helen LaFrance Story

Historical novels
 Twilight of the Immortal, Anaphora Literary Press, CreateSpace, 2011,

Novels
Freak Parade, Amazon Digital Services, Inc., 2010, 
 When the Night Stood Still: An Erotic Romance, Magic Carpet Books, 2004, 
 When Hearts Collide: An Erotic Romance, Magic Carpet Books, 2003, 
 In the Secret Hours, Magic Carpet Books, 2003,

Short stories
 Neptune and Surf, Masquerade Books, 1999,

References

External links
 website
 interview, Clean Sheets Erotica Magazine
 interview, Smith Magazine

1960 births
Living people
American bloggers
American book editors
American women writers
Writers from Columbus, Ohio
American women bloggers
21st-century American women